Etiella behrii is a species of moth of the family Pyralidae. It is found in Hong Kong, Indonesia, Malaysia and most of Australia.

The wingspan is about 10 mm.

The larvae are considered an agricultural pest on peanut (Arachis hypogaea), Chamaecytisus prolifer, sky lupine (Lupinus nanus), alfalfa (Medicago sativa), pea (Pisum sativum) and soybean (Glycine species).

References

Phycitini
Moths described in 1848
Moths of Asia
Moths of Australia
Moths of New Zealand
Taxa named by Philipp Christoph Zeller